The Municipality of Rečica ob Savinji is a municipality in the traditional region of Styria in northeastern Slovenia. The seat of the municipality is the town of Rečica ob Savinji. Rečica ob Savinji became a municipality in 2006.

Settlements
In addition to the municipal seat of Rečica ob Savinji, the municipality also includes the following settlements:

 Dol–Suha
 Grušovlje
 Homec
 Nizka
 Poljane
 Spodnja Rečica
 Spodnje Pobrežje
 Šentjanž
 Trnovec
 Varpolje
 Zgornje Pobrežje

References

External links

Municipality of Rečica ob Savinji on Geopedia
Municipality of Rečica ob Savinji website

Rečica ob Savinji
2006 establishments in Slovenia